Pseudischnocampa nigridorsata is a moth in the family Erebidae. It was described by William Schaus in 1901. It is found in Peru, Argentina and Ecuador.

Subspecies
Pseudischnocampa nigridorsata nigridorsata (Peru)
Pseudischnocampa nigridorsata albidior Rothschild, 1935 (Argentina)
Pseudischnocampa nigridorsata fulvonebulosa Reich, 1938 (Ecuador)

References

Moths described in 1901
Phaegopterina